Ali Erfan (born 18 March 1915, date of death unknown) was an Egyptian wrestler. He competed in the men's Greco-Roman bantamweight at the 1936 Summer Olympics.

References

External links
 

1915 births
Year of death missing
Egyptian male sport wrestlers
Olympic wrestlers of Egypt
Wrestlers at the 1936 Summer Olympics